Wikander is a surname and may refer to:
 David Wikander (1884–1955), Swedish musicologist, organist and composer
 Ola Wikander (born 1981), Swedish writer, translator and theologian
 Stig Wikander (1908–1983), Swedish indologist, iranologist and historian of religions
 Örjan Wikander (born 1943), Swedish classical archaeologist and ancient historian

See also
 Vikander